is the third main series of the Yu-Gi-Oh! franchise, succeeding Yu-Gi-Oh! GX, in celebration of the 40th anniversary of Weekly Shonen Jump and the 15th anniversary of V Jump. The series aired in Japan from April 2, 2008 to March 30, 2011.

The story focuses around characters playing a card game called Duel Monsters. This series introduces Synchro Monsters to the Yu-Gi-Oh! Trading Card Game. A new method of dueling exists where motorcycle-like vehicles called D-Wheels (Duel Runners in the English version) are used, and the duelists engage in games called Riding Duels (Turbo Duels in the English version). The show is set in the distant future, where the upper class population live in Neo Domino City (New Domino City in the English version) and the lower class in a remote island where Domino's sewage is transported, Satellite. Yusei Fudo, the 18-year-old protagonist, lives in Satellite and makes it his objective to reach his rival Jack Atlas, who lives in Neo Domino. The series focuses on the five Signers, people embodied with a mark of one of the legendary Five Dragons who serve an ancient deity called the Crimson Dragon, their conflict with the Dark Signers, and the Three Emperors of Iliaster.

As with the previous two anime series (Yu-Gi-Oh! Duel Monsters and  Yu-Gi-Oh! GX), Yu-Gi-Oh! 5D's was acquired by 4Kids Entertainment for broadcasting in the United States in September 2008. The series aired on The CW4Kids, from September 13, 2008 to September 10, 2011, though 31 episodes were left unaired as well as undubbed. The English-language version premiered on July 24 at San Diego Comic-Con 2008, where the first English-dubbed episode was previewed. Like the previous two English dubs, changes have been made to the plot, cards, and character names. On June 1, 2009, the series began airing 5 days a week on Cartoon Network. A manga based on the show began serialization in V Jump monthly Magazine from August 2009 to January 2015.

The series was succeeded by Yu-Gi-Oh! Zexal.

Plot

Yu-Gi-Oh! 5D's is set in the future in Neo Domino City.

Seventeen years prior, a reactor called Moment within the city malfunctioned and caused a great earthquake that split the city in two parts: Satellite, the rundown and poverty-stricken part (also the former Domino City), and Neo Domino City, the wealthier and urban part. In order to keep the two areas separate, access to the city from the Satellite is strictly prohibited and can result in imprisonment. Yusei Fudo, an aspiring duelist from Satellite, builds his own Duel Runner (D-Wheel in the Japanese version), but his best friend Jack Atlas betrays him and steals his vehicle along with his most precious monster, Stardust Dragon, escaping to Neo Domino.

Two years later, Yusei builds another one and secretly travels to the city to win back his Dragon. Jack has made a name for himself and his monster, Red Dragon Archfiend, as the current Turbo Duel King in Neo Domino City. Yusei and Jack face each other in a turbo duel, Yusei and Jack's arms glow red, a third red dragon appears, and brings an abrupt end to the fight. Goodwin also reveals that Jack and Yusei are both Signers and holds a tournament to find the other three. Two of the other signers turn out to be child duelist Luna and psychic duelist Akiza. In the final battle, all four Signers see a vision of the future with the Satellite in ruins.

Goodwin reveals that the Signers are destined to face the Dark Signers, duelists resurrected from the dead to serve the evil Earthbound Gods. The Signers head to Satellite to face the Dark Signers which consist of: Roman Goodwin (Rex's brother, a former Signer with the dragon's Head mark and leader of the Dark Signers), Kalin Kessler (a former friend of Yusei, Jack and Crow Hogan), Devack (the one who stole the Ancient Fairy Dragon card, Luna's Signer Dragon), Misty Tredwell (a model who blames Akiza for the death of her brother Toby), Greiger (who blamed Rex Goodwin for his village's disappearance), and briefly Carly (a blogger with feelings for Jack). With the help of Leo, Luna's twin brother, and Crow Hogan, Yusei and Jack's best friend, they are able to defeat all the Dark Signers.  However, Rex Goodwin reveals that he has become a Dark Signer and uses his brother's severed arm to become a Signer as well. With the power of both the light and the shadows, he wishes to rebuild the world in his image. Yusei, Jack and Crow then face him in a turbo duel in order to stop him and King of the Netherworld from finishing off the Signers and destroying the world. Before the final attack, Yusei gains the Head mark, making him the new leader, while Crow gains his former Tail mark, making him the fifth Signer. With the power of the Crimson Dragon and Yusei's Majestic Star Dragon, he defeats Goodwin who, along with Roman, sacrifice themselves to destroy the King of the Netherworld and revive the Dark Signers as normal people again.

After the Dark Signers' defeat, Neo Domino City and Satellite are finally reunited into one prosperous city with the building of the "Daedalus Bridge", an intricate net of roads linking both Satellite and Neo Domino City with some sections also used for turbo duels. Yusei and his friends, now calling themselves "Team 5D's", prepare for the upcoming World Riding Duel Grand Prix (WRGP) tournament. A new threat appears, the Three Emperors of Iliaster, whose main monsters, the "Machine Emperors", can absorb Synchro Monsters from their opponents to empower themselves. Yusei encounters a fellow competitor, Sherry LeBlanc, who is investigating the Iliaster organization, that is reportedly responsible for her parents' deaths. Team 5D's is also joined by a mysterious amnesiac mechanic named Bruno, who quickly befriends the team and helps them prepare for the WRGP. The WRGP soon begins, with Team 5D's facing tough opponents such as Team Unicorn, a world-ranked dueling team, Team Taiyo, a new dueling team who started with nothing, and Team Ragnarok, who possess special abilities like the Signers. Team 5Ds eventually confront the Emperors themselves, who are revealed to be three different incarnations of Aporia, a cyborg sent from the future to destroy Neo Domino City to prevent a great calamity from befalling mankind in the future.

Although Team 5D's defeats Aporia and wins the WRGP, a massive citadel known as the Ark Cradle appears and threatens to crash into Neo Domino City and destroy it. Team 5D's climbs aboard it to stop it. Before reaching the core of the fortress, they confront three individuals guarding its access: Akiza and Crow face Sherry, who was promised to have her parents returned to her; Yusei faces Bruno, who recovered his memories of being Antinomy, another member of Iliaster; and Jack, Leo and Luna face Aporia. Leo dies during the duel and is revived by the Crimson Dragon, becoming the sixth Signer bearing the mark of the dragon's Heart. When the Signers finally reach Z-one, Iliaster's leader, Yusei borrows his friends' dragons to add them to his deck, and challenges Z-one to a final turbo duel to decide Neo Domino City's future. Z-one is revealed to be a scientist from the future who assumed Yusei's identity and traveled back in time to prevent the destruction of humanity. Yusei manages to use his friends' cards to perform a "Limit Over Accel Synchro" and summon his strongest monster, "Shooting Quasar Dragon". After Z-one is defeated by Yusei, he decides to entrust the future of mankind to Yusei, and sacrifices himself to destroy the Ark Cradle and save Neo Domino City from destruction.

A few months pass after the Signers' victory over Iliaster, and the former members of Team 5D's move on with their lives following separate paths. With one final duel between Jack and Yusei, they all part ways, except for Yusei, who decides to stay in Neo Domino City and research for a way to stop the destruction of humanity in the future. The other Signers leave the city knowing they will be connected with each other and will return after fulfilling their dreams.

Themes

The first story arc addresses themes such as social class division, segregation, and discrimination, depicted through the interactions between residents of Neo Domino City, and Satellite. The Dark Signer arc deals with the relationship between past and present, as the heroes (especially Yusei, Aki, and Jack) must come to terms with the questionable actions they, or their family members, have made. The final two arcs, the World Grand Prix and Ark Cradle, build on the previous arc by exploring the connection between present and future, as Time Travel plays a major role in how the story unfolds. Synchro Monsters also play a major role in the final two arcs, as their subsequent overuse in the future prompts the final antagonists to seek the destruction of Neo Domino City. Lastly, just like all Yu-Gi-Oh! series, 5D's places a huge emphasis on bonds and friendships.

Similar to how the original series utilized elements of Egyptian mythology  to drive the plot, 5D's loosely used bits of  Incan Mythology (such as the Nazca Lines) early on to set the groundwork for its supernatural phenomena and lore. It was planned that the rest of the series would follow this thematic plot, until a real-life incident involving a cult member in the staff caused this original plotline to be dropped in favor of a dystopian future story in later seasons. To push this motif even further, the manga (which featured an entirely different plot from the anime) depicted the origin of Riding Duels being played on horseback, in coliseums, by Ancient Incan civilizations.

Media

Anime

Yu-Gi-Oh! 5D's was produced by Nihon Ad Systems and TV Tokyo, and the show's animation was handled by Studio Gallop. It aired on TV Tokyo between April 2, 2008 and March 30, 2011, following the end of the previous series, Yu-Gi-Oh! Duel Monsters GX. As with the previous two series (Yu-Gi-Oh! Duel Monsters  and Yu-Gi-Oh! Duel Monsters GX), this series was acquired by 4Kids Entertainment for broadcasting and began airing in the United States in September 2008. The English adaptation of Yu-Gi-Oh! 5D’s is also distributed by Warner Bros. Family Entertainment and Warner Bros. Television Animation. Yu-Gi-Oh! 5D's began airing on The CW4Kids, starting on September 13, 2008, and later aired on Cartoon Network. On May 29, 2010, the series once again began airing in 1-hour episode blocks on the CW4Kids. The series moved over to the Toonzai block on September 18, 2010. The last episode of the dubbed series aired on September 10, 2011, leaving out several episodes from the Japanese broadcast. As a result, 5D's became the second series to not have a complete English dub. Changes have been made to the plot and cards, character names have been localized, and violent scenes have been edited.

In Germany, however, the dub stopped using the 4Kids version and began adapting the show directly from Japan from episode 65 onward for unknown reasons. While the original voice cast from the first 64 episodes was still used, the show no longer edited quite as much, used the original music (including the original Japanese opening and ending themes), and adapted their scripts directly from the original Japanese scripts rather than from the revised English scripts.

On September 22, 2010, Toonzaki and Hulu uploaded unedited, subtitled and edited, dubbed episodes of Yu-Gi-Oh! 5D's. These episodes use the English names for the cards instead of the Japanese names. In an Anime News Network interview with Mark Kirk, Senior Vice President of Digital Media for 4Kids Entertainment, Kirk claimed this was due to legal reasons.

On April 2, 2018, the series was released with Latin American Spanish dubbing in the United States (for US Hispanic audiences) on ¡Sorpresa!. Subsequently, the series was uploaded on the streaming service VEMOX, also in Spanish.

Manga
A manga series based on the show written by Sato Masashi began serialization in V Jump from August 21, 2009 to January 21, 2015. Like the manga adaptation of Yu-Gi-Oh! GX, the adaptation features an original storyline, different monsters, and various differences from the anime version. The series has been licensed by Viz Media for North America.

Trading Card Game

Yu-Gi-Oh! 5D's added a new gameplay element to the Yu-Gi-Oh! Trading Card Game, in which Master Rules came into effect by introducing Synchro Summoning to the game. To Synchro Summon the new white-colored Synchro Monsters, a Tuner Monster and a non-Tuner monster is required to be on the field, and their added levels must equal to the desired Synchro Monster to be summoned. A new monster type known as Psychic was also added to the game.

Another type of gameplay mechanic unique to the anime version was also introduced, called "Dark Synchro Summon", which is the thematic opposite of the normal Synchro Summon. In the normal Synchro Summon, the levels of the Tuner monster(s) and non-Tuner monster(s) are added up to be equal to the level of the summoned monster, whereas Dark Synchro Summon subtracts the level of the non-Tuner monster from the anime-exclusive Dark Tuner monster monster's, instead. The card game has released these "Dark Synchro Monsters" as regular Synchro Monsters, though they require a DARK-attribute Tuner monster instead as opposed to Konami releasing Dark Tuners.

Video games

There are several video games developed by Konami based on the Yu-Gi-Oh! 5D's franchise.

Yu-Gi-Oh! 5D's: Wheelie Breakers was released on March 26, 2009 and is a racing game for the Wii console in which players can use cards to lower other people's life points and defeat them. Unlike the card game, monsters use Speed Counters to attack their opponents, and players do not lose if their life points hit zero, rather they are unable to continue racing. The Promotional cards are Skull Flame, Burning Skull Head, and Supersonic Skull Flame.

Yu-Gi-Oh! 5D's Stardust Accelerator was released on March 26, 2009 and is a game for the Nintendo DS that continues the World Championship series of games. The game uses the World Championship 2009 software, and also features a story mode, in which a duelist tries to get his memory back. In the video game Yu-Gi-Oh! 5D's World Championship 2009: Stardust Accelerator, winning all single tournaments appears as an unlockable opponent: Endymion, the Master Magician, known as Divine Magician Deity Endymion in the Japanese version, is a character version of the card, "Endymion, the Master Magician". The Promotional Cards are Infernity Archfiend, Infernity Dwarf, and Infernity Guardian.

Yu-Gi-Oh! 5D's: Reverse of Arcadia, also for the Nintendo DS, is also part of the World Championship series. Set during the Dark Signers arc, the player controls a former member of the Enforcers who has been brainwashed by the Arcadia movement.

The promotional cards are Stygian Security, Samurai Sword Baron and Stygian Sergeants. Yu-Gi-Oh! 5D's World Championship 2011: Over the Nexus, was released on February 24, 2011. The game features over 4,200 cards, and a Puzzle Editor. This game was released in Japan on February 18, 2010, North America on February 23, 2010 and Europe on March 26, 2010. Its promotional cards are Sorciere de Fleur, Z-ONE and Necro Fleur.

Yu-Gi-Oh! 5D's Tag Force 4 was released on September 17, 2009 and is a game for the PSP system, the fourth game in the Tag Force series. The game features the Dark Synchro and Dark Tuner monsters from the 2nd season of the anime. The Promotional Cards are Warm Worm, Worm Bait, and Regret Reborn. This was followed by Yu-Gi-Oh! 5D's Tag Force 5, which was released on September 16, 2010 and set during the third season of the anime. A last game, Yu-Gi-Oh! 5D's Tag Force 6 was later released that covered up until the end of the series.

Yu-Gi-Oh! 5D's Decade Duels for the Xbox Live Arcade was released on November 3, 2010. and is a game that features online leader boards and voice chat functionality, as well as the ability to buy extra cards via Xbox Live Marketplace. The game was removed from the service in June 2012. It returned as Yu-Gi-Oh! 5D's Decade Duels Plus on November 21, 2012 but it was removed on the same day for unknown reasons. It reappeared again on February 13, 2013.

Yu-Gi-Oh! 5D's Duel Transer (known as Yu-Gi-Oh! 5D's Master of the Cards in Europe) was released on April 21, 2011 and is a game for the Wii system features over 4,500 cards and Wi-Fi multiplayer. This game came with promotional cards Fighter Ape, Closed Forest, and Roaring Earth and a Duel Scanner accessory which allows players to scan their real world cards into the game.

Yu-Gi-Oh Online 3: Duel Accelerator was the 3rd installment of the Yu-Gi-Oh! Online series.  It was based around Yu-Gi-Oh! 5D's.  It was released on December 18, 2009 and was shut down on September 30, 2012 due to an internal decision by Konami.

On September 25, 2018 a 5D's World, alongside Synchro Summoning, was added to the mobile game Yu-Gi-Oh! Duel Links.

Notes and references

Notes
 Though "5D's" stands for "5 Dragons", it has been incorrectly quoted as standing for "5 Dimensions" by 4Kids. V Jump magazine printed an issue explaining the correct interpretation.

References

External links

 Yu-Gi-Oh! 5D'S at TV Tokyo (Japanese)
 

2008 anime television series debuts
2009 manga
2008 Japanese television series debuts
2011 Japanese television series endings
Adventure anime and manga
Anime spin-offs
Comics based on television series
Fictional motorsports in anime and manga
Gallop (studio)
Konami
Science fiction anime and manga
Shōnen manga
Shueisha franchises
Shueisha manga
TV Tokyo original programming
Viz Media manga
Yu-Gi-Oh!
Yu-Gi-Oh!-related anime
Card games in anime and manga